Great Australian Bight Marine Park is the name given to a group of marine protected areas which are located together within both Australian and South Australian jurisdictions in the Great Australian Bight and which has been in use as recently as 2005.  The constituent protected areas are the Great Australian Bight Marine National Park and the Great Australian Bight Marine Park Whale Sanctuary within the coastal waters of South Australia, and the Great Australian Bight Commonwealth Marine Reserve in waters within the Australian Exclusive economic zone.  It was listed on the now-defunct Register of the National Estate.

See also
 Great Australian Bight Marine Park (Commonwealth waters)

References

External links
Great Australian Bight Marine Park (South Australian government webpage accessed and archived 6 October 2008
 

Protected areas managed by the Australian government
Marine protected areas of South Australia
Great Australian Bight
South Australian places listed on the defunct Register of the National Estate